Major Manna Singh (20 February 1914 – 22 July 1954) was an Indian field hockey player and officer in the British Indian Army. He was the coach of Indian field hockey team.

History
Manna Singh was born in Naushera, Punjab British India on 20 February 1914. Manna Singh father's name was Kalyan Singh. Manna got his BS degree at Khalsa College, Amritsar. He joined the British India Army before India's independence in 1947.

Manna Singh was selected to play in 1940 Summer Olympics, but the Olympic Games were suspended indefinitely due to the World War II and did not resume until the London Games of 1948.

After 1947 India's independence Manna got transferred to Indian army. He played top level field hockey along with major Dhyan Chand. 1950 Manna along with Dhyan Chand got services gold medal. Manna served Indian Army at Pune and Ahmedabad. In 1954 he was posted in J&K, India.

In 1951, he played for Indian hockey team and won Rangaswami Cup with his team.

Death
Manna Singh died on 22 July 1954 while patrolling LoC (Line of control) in Poonch, J&K, India. He was survived by wife Jagjit, son Daljit and daughters Harkirat and Kamaljit.

References

Indian male field hockey players
1914 births
1954 deaths
Field hockey players from Punjab, India